Asprocottus minor is a species of ray-finned fish belonging to the family Cottidae, the typical sculpins.  It was described by Valentina Grigorievna Sideleva in 2001, originally as a subspecies of Asprocottus korjakovi. It is a freshwater fish which is endemic to Lake Baikal, Russia.

References

minor
Fish described in 2001
Fish of Lake Baikal